Artur Dovlatzhonovich Razhabov (born 28 April 1989) is a Russian curler from Saint Petersburg. He currently plays second for the Russian national curling team.

Razhabov was a member of the Russian team at the 2011 and 2014 European Curling Championships. He played lead for Alexey Tselousov at the 2011 European Curling Championships, finishing 11th place. At the 2014 European Curling Championships, he played second for Evgeny Arkhipov, finishing sixth. The placement qualified the team to represent Russia at the 2015 Ford World Men's Curling Championship, Razhabov's first.

Also in 2015, Razhabov was a member of the Russian team (skipped by Arkhipov) that won a silver medal at the 2015 Winter Universiade.

References

External links

Russian male curlers
Curlers from Saint Petersburg
Living people
1989 births
Universiade medalists in curling
Universiade silver medalists for Russia
Competitors at the 2015 Winter Universiade
Competitors at the 2017 Winter Universiade